The Racquet Club of Philadelphia (RCOP) is a private social club and athletic club in Philadelphia, Pennsylvania. It has facilities for squash, real tennis, and racquets. The club is ranked in the Top 20 Athletic Clubs on the Platinum Club of America list.

History
Established in 1889, the Club started its life in a modest facility at 923 Walnut Street. Under the leadership of George D. Widener, the current 16th Street Clubhouse was built by architect Horace Trumbauer. Historian Nathaniel Burt described the new 1907 Clubhouse as "by far the best appointed...of all Philadelphia clubs." The clubhouse is one of the first reinforced concrete structures designed in Philadelphia, and also includes the world's first above grade swimming pool, designed by the noted bridge builders Roebling Construction Company. The building's red-brick, Georgian design, is evocative of historic Philadelphia, and the Clubhouse was placed on the National Register of Historic Places in 1979.

The Club was the site of the invention of squash doubles by Frederick C. Tompkins. The new building had a space that was too large for a standard squash court but too small for further locker facilities and Tomkins recommended that it be used for squash doubles.

The RCOP's racquet sport facilities include 6 international squash singles courts, 1 squash doubles court, 1 court tennis court, and 1 racquets court. The Club also has overnight rooms along with a fitness center for the use of members and sponsored guests, as well as a bar and serves lunch daily. It is open to members 365 days a year and is located on 16th Street between Walnut and Locust in the heart of Philadelphia's Rittenhouse Square area.

The Club has hosted many international court tennis, racquets, and squash doubles tournaments and has produced notable U.S. national champions including Jay Gould, Jock Soutar, Stanley Pearson and Morris Clothier.

The U.S. Squash Hall of Fame was briefly at the Club until moving to Yale University.

Champion Members
Jock Soutar.
Jay Gould II.
Morris Clothier.

See also

 List of American gentlemen's clubs

References

External links
 The Racquet Club of Philadelphia

1889 establishments in Pennsylvania
Athletics clubs in the United States
Clubhouses on the National Register of Historic Places in Philadelphia
Organizations based in Philadelphia
Racquets venues in the United States
Real tennis venues
Sports clubs established in 1889
Squash venues in the United States
Sports venues in Philadelphia
Tennis in Pennsylvania
Gentlemen's clubs in the United States
History of Philadelphia
Rittenhouse Square, Philadelphia
Sports venues on the National Register of Historic Places in Pennsylvania
Horace Trumbauer buildings
Tennis venues in Pennsylvania
Tennis clubs